Lagunitas (Laguna, Spanish for "Little lagoons") is an unincorporated community in Marin County, California. For census purposes, Lagunitas is aggregated with Forest Knolls into the census-designated place Lagunitas-Forest Knolls.

The first post office at Lagunitas opened in 1906. Lagunitas' ZIP Code is 94938.

References

Unincorporated communities in California
Unincorporated communities in Marin County, California